Middlebury is an unincorporated community in Van Wert County, in the U.S. state of Ohio.

History
Middlebury was originally called Daisie, and under the latter name was founded in 1850. A post office called Dasie was established in 1881, and remained in operation until 1904. The present name of Middlebury is descriptive for the community's relatively central location between Van Wert and Decatur.

References

Unincorporated communities in Van Wert County, Ohio
Unincorporated communities in Ohio
1850 establishments in Ohio